The men's 5000 metres event at the 2001 Summer Universiade was held in Beijing, China between 30 August and 1 September.

Medalists

Results

Heats

Final

References

Athletics at the 2001 Summer Universiade
2001